The montane white-toothed shrew (Crocidura montis) is a species of mammal in the family Soricidae. It is found in Kenya, South Sudan, Tanzania, and Uganda. Its natural habitats are subtropical or tropical moist montane forest and subtropical or tropical seasonally wet or flooded lowland grassland. It is threatened by habitat loss.

References

Crocidura
Mammals described in 1906
Taxa named by Oldfield Thomas
Taxonomy articles created by Polbot